Lake Tanglewood is a village in Randall County, Texas, United States. The population was 796 at the 2010 census. It is part of the Amarillo, Texas Metropolitan Statistical Area.

Geography

Demographics

2020 census

As of the 2020 United States census, there were 686 people, 318 households, and 243 families residing in the village.

2000 census
As of the census of 2000, there were 825 people, 342 households, and 282 families residing in the village. The population density was 777.4 people per square mile (300.5/km2). There were 402 housing units at an average density of 378.8/sq mi (146.4/km2). The racial makeup of the village was 98.06% White, 0.73% Native American, 0.12% Pacific Islander, 0.36% from other races, and 0.73% from two or more races. Hispanic or Latino of any race were 1.94% of the population.

There were 342 households, out of which 24.6% had children under the age of 18 living with them, 78.7% were married couples living together, 2.3% had a female householder with no husband present, and 17.5% were non-families. 14.0% of all households were made up of individuals, and 6.1% had someone living alone who was 65 years of age or older. The average household size was 2.41 and the average family size was 2.66.

In the village, the age distribution of the population shows 17.8% under the age of 18, 5.5% from 18 to 24, 19.4% from 25 to 44, 39.9% from 45 to 64, and 17.5% who were 65 years of age or older. The median age was 49 years. For every 100 females there were 102.7 males. For every 100 females age 18 and over, there were 99.4 males.

The median income for a household in the village was $67,344, and the median income for a family was $76,641. Males had a median income of $61,944 versus $30,938 for females. The per capita income for the village was $38,159. About 5.5% of families and 6.2% of the population were below the poverty line, including 9.7% of those under age 18 and 4.8% of those age 65 or over.

References

External links

Villages in Randall County, Texas
Villages in Texas
Villages in Amarillo metropolitan area